William Vail Moore was a member of the Wisconsin State Assembly.

Biography
Moore was born on January 15, 1818, in Minisink, New York. He moved to what is now Yorkville, Wisconsin. There, he was a farmer by trade.

Political career
Moore was a member of the Assembly during the 1872 session. Previously, he had been an unsuccessful candidate for the Assembly in 1858. Other positions Moore held include County Treasurer of Racine County, Wisconsin. He was a Republican.

References

People from Minisink, New York
People from Yorkville, Wisconsin
Republican Party members of the Wisconsin State Assembly
County treasurers in Wisconsin
Farmers from Wisconsin
1818 births
Year of death missing